This is a list of recording artists signed to Sony Music Entertainment.

0-9

12 Gauge
14 Bis
1976 
24kGoldn
3rd Bass
3rd Faze
4th Impact
50 Cent

A

A1
A-Lin
Aaron Carter
ABBA
AC/DC
Adam Harvey
Adam Lambert
Adam Sandler
Addrisi Brothers
Adele
Adriana Evans
Aerosmith
Afrojack
Agnez Mo
The Airborne Toxic Event
AKA (rapper)
Akasa Singh
Aiden Grimshaw
Air Supply
Alan Parsons Project
Alan Silvestri
Alan Walker
Alex & Sierra
Alexandra Burke
Alexis Jordan
Ali Baba
Alice in Chains
Alicia Keys
Alizée
Alif Satar
Aliff Aziz
The Alkaholiks
Alkaline Trio
Ali Kiba
All Ends
Allen Su
Amanda Black
Amaal Malik
Amanda Seyfried
Amaia Montero
Amelia Lily
Amon Amarth
Amy Mastura
Ana Carolina
Anastacia
Angy Fernandez
Anirudh Ravichander
Anna Vissi
Anthony Hamilton
Antonis Remos
Andy Williams
Annie Lennox
Annihilator
Anti-Flag
Aram Quartet
AR Rahman
Arijit Singh
Armaan Malik
Art Garfunkel
Asia Cruise
Astrid
Ateez
Audioslave
Audy
Automatic Loveletter
Avicii
Avril Lavigne
Aston Merrygold
Aynur Doğan

B

B Praak
Baccara
Backstreet Boys
Bakugan
BTS
Bars and Melody
Bamboo Shoots
Bathiya & Santhush
Barbra Streisand
Babyface
BBC Concert Orchestra
BBC Symphony Orchestra
The Beatnuts
Beau Coup
Beau Ryan
Becky G
Belinda Carlisle
Ben&Ben
Beyoncé Knowles
Big Boi
Big L
Big Mountain
Big Pun
Big Ric
Big Time Rush
Bic Runga
Billy Joel
Blind Channel
Blood, Sweat & Tears
Blue Öyster Cult
Bob Dylan
Bobby McFerrin
Bohemia
Bondan Prakoso & Fade 2 Black
Boney M.
Bonnie Anderson
Bow Wow
Bowling for Soup
Boyzone
Boys Like Girls
Boef
Brad Paisley
Brian Joo
Brian Melo
Brian Moon (music producer)
Brandy
Bressie
Bring Me the Horizon
Britney Spears
Brooke Barrettsmith
Brooke Fraser
Brown Eyed Girls
Brownsville Station a.k.a. Brownsville
Bruce Springsteen
Buddy Guy
Bullet For My Valentine
Bunkface
Burning Heads
The Byrds

C

C+C Music Factory
C4 Pedro
Call It Off
Calle Kristiansson
Cappadonna
Cartel de Santa
Carlos Vives
Cartouche
Cascada
Costel Busuioc
Collie Buddz
Chayanne
CD9
Chevelle
Caetano Veloso
Caillou
Cake
Calle 13
Calvin Harris
Camila
Camila Cabello
Carly Rae Jepsen
Carly Simon
Carola Häggkvist
Carrie Underwood
Carrossel
Casting Crowns
CeeLo Green
Celine Dion
Cella Dwellas
Chad Kroeger
Cher
Charles Aznavour
Cherrybelle
Chicago (band)
Chicago Symphony Orchestra
Chico Science
Chipmunk
Chord Overstreet
Chris Brown
Chris Daughtry
Chris Rene
Chris Thomas King
Christina Aguilera
Ciara
Cindy Yen
Cinta Laura
The Clash
CNCO
Coheed and Cambria
Cokelat
Colin Farrell
Colonel Abrams
Conchita Wurst
Corbin Bleu
Cory Monteith
Courtney Johnson
Cosmic Girls
Cradle of Filth
Craig David
Crayon Pop
Cui Jian
C:Real
Cyndi Lauper
Carpark North
Camilo
CLMD
CupcakKe

D

Daddy DJ
Daddy Yankee
Daft Punk
Dami Im
Damien Leith
Damares
Dan Hartman
Daneliya Tuleshova
Danell Lee
Daniel Boaventura
Daniele Silvestri
Danny Gokey
Danny Romero
Darell
Darren Criss
Daryl Braithwaite
Daughtry
Dave Matthews Band
Dave Wong
David Archuleta
David Arnold
David Bowie
David Campbell
David Cassidy
David Cook
David Gilmour
David Guetta
David Hallyday
Davido
Davina
D'banj
Dead Prez
Dean Martin
Dean Ray
Dee Deee
Debi Nova
Delinquent Habits
Delta Goodrem
Depeche Mode
Derby Romero
Destiny Chukunyere
Dewiq
Dhanush
Dido
Diamond White
Diana Garnet
Diana Ross
Diana Yukawa
Dianna Agron
Dixie Chicks
DJ Khaled
DJ Yella
DMX
Do
Dolla
Doja Cat
Domenic Marte
Dominic Fike
Dope
Double You
Doug Kershaw
Duran Duran
Destiny's Child
Doctor Prita
Daisy Dares You
Decyfer Down
Drapht
Dreamcatcher

E

Earl Sweatshirt
Earth, Wind & Fire
Eartha Kitt
Edita Abdieski
Édith Piaf
Eels
Electric Light Orchestra
Elena Paparizou
Eleni Foureira
Elizabeth Gillies
Ella Henderson
Elmer Bernstein
ELO Part II
Elva Hsiao
Elvis Presley
Elyar Fox
Eithne Ní Uallacháin
Emblem3
Emicida
Emilia Mernes
Emily Blunt
Emily Osment
Emiri Miyamoto
Emma Roberts
Ennio Morricone
Enrique Iglesias
Era Istrefi
E-Rotic
Escala
Eugenio Bennato
Europe
Eurythmics
Eva Avila
Evan Yo
Evanescence
EXID

F

F4
Faith Hill
Fallulah
Fatboy Slim
Fatin Shidqia
Faye Wong
Felly
Felony
Fergie
Fernanda Takai
Fey
Fifth Harmony
Filippa Giordano
Fireflight
Fiona Apple
Fiona Fung
Fleur East
Flow
Franz Ferdinand
Foo Fighters
Foster the People
Fozzy
Frank Sinatra
Frances Yip
Frans
Freddie Jackson
Fresno
Fugees
Funkmaster Flex

G

Gamaliel, Audrey, Cantika
Gang of Youths
Gangsta Boo
G.E.M
Gene Autry
Genesis
Gerardo Ortiz
George Clinton
George Ezra
George Gershwin
George Michael
Gerald Alston
Ghostface Killah
Gigi D'Agostino
Giorgia
Gita Gutawa
Giusy Ferreri
Glasvegas
Glee Cast
Gloc-9
Gloria Estefan
Gogol Bordello
Good Charlotte
Gorillaz
Grimethorpe Colliery Band
Gromee
Groove Armada
Guy Sebastian

H

Ha*Ash
Haddaway
Hannah Barrett
Harry Styles
H-Blockx
Hard Kaur
Hardy Sandhu
Harris Jayaraj
Heather Morris
Henry Mancini
H.E.R.
Hey Monday
Hi-5
Hijau Daun
Hilary Duff
HIM
Hironobu Kageyama
The Hives
Hoobastank
Hoodoo Gurus
The Hoosiers
Hollywood Studio Symphony
Hu Xia
Human Nature
Hurts

I

I Am Giant
Ian Lloyd
In Flames
Ivi Adamou
Imogen Heap
Indiana
Infectious Grooves
Incubus
Inspectah Deck
INXS
Irene Cara
Iron Maiden
Ironhorse
Isaac Hayes
Isyana Sarasvati
Il Divo
Il Volo

J

J. Fred Knobloch
Jackie Thomas
The Jacksons
Jai Waetford
Jason Chan
Jack Black
Jack Ingram
Jackie Evancho
Jacky Wu
Jahmene Douglas
Jake Owen
James Blunt
James Brown
James Horner
James Ingram
Jamie Foxx
Jane Zhang
Jasmine Sandlas
Jasmine Villegas
Jay Chou
Jay Sean
JC de Vera
Jean-Michel Jarre
Jeff Beck
Jennifer Lopez
Jennifer Love Hewitt
Jeremy Renner
Jerry Burns
Jerry Goldsmith
Jessica Sanchez
Jett Rebel
James Arthur
Jessica Simpson
Jessica Mauboy
Jessie J
Jimi Jamison
Jimi Hendrix
JLS
JM de Guzman
Joanna Wang
Joaquín Sabina
Joe Satriani
John Cafferty and the Beaver Brown Band
John Denver
John & Edward
John Farnham
John Legend
John Mayer
John Paul Young
John Schneider
John Williams
Johnny Cash
JoJo
Jolin Tsai
Jonas Brothers
Jordin Sparks
Jorge Celedon
Josh Pyke
Josh Shapiro
Jota Quest
Journey
JPM (band)
Juan Magan
Judas Priest
Julieta Venegas
Justice Crew
Justin Bieber
Justin Timberlake

K

KAIA
Kalan Porter
Kana Nishino
Karmin
Karnivool
Kasabian
Kat Deluna
Kate Ceberano
Katy Garbi
Katy Perry
Keith Whitley
Keko
K Koke
Kelly Clarkson
Kelly Key
Ken Choi
Kenia Os
Kenny Chesney
Kenny Loggins
Kenshi Yonezu
Kesha
Kep1er
Khwezi
Kid Ink
Kidz Bop
Killarmy
Kim Wilde
Kimberley Chen
Kings of Leon
Kira Isabella
Kizaru
KLa Project
K.O
Kool Savas
Korn
Ken Hirai
Kreayshawn
Kris Allen
Kygo
Kalafina
Kyung

L

L.V.
Labrinth
La Bouche
La The Darkman
Lali
Lang Lang
La Oreja De Van Gogh
La Quinta Estación
L'Arc-en-Ciel
Lala Karmela
Latino
Le Click
Lea Michele
Lea Salonga
Lecrae
Lee DeWyze
Leif Garrett
Len
Lenka
Leo Jaime
Len Carlson
Leona Lewis
Leonard Bernstein
Leonard Cohen
Less Than Jake
Leslie Grace
Lil' Flip
Lil Nas X
Lin Yu Chun
Linda Ronstadt
Lion
Lisa Lougheed
Lit
Litfiba
Little Trees
Little Sea
Lim Hyung Joo
Limão Com Mel
Lira
Locnville
Loïc Nottet
Lodovica Comello
London Symphony Orchestra
Lordi
Los Angeles Philharmonic
Los del Río
Louise Carver
Loverboy
Lovi Poe
Lil Loaded
LSD
Lucy Spraggan
Ludovico Einaudi
Luiz Gonzaga
Luke
Luke Mejares
Lulu Antariksa
Lulu Santos
Lyfe Jennings
Loick Essien
Little Mix
Little Nikki

M

M.O.P.
Mad Kap
Mafia Honey
Maja Salvador
Mamoru Miyano
Manga
Mango
Maher Zain
Maja Salvador
Malú
Madeon
Mandy Moore
Maria Lawson
Mariah Carey
Mariana Rios
Mary Byrne
Marc Anthony
Marc Mysterio
Marco Mengoni
Marcus & Martinus
Maren Morris
Mark Ronson
Mark Vincent
Marlisa Punzalan
Martin Garrix
Matt Cardle
Matt Stone
Maurice Jarre
Max Schneider
Mayré Martínez
Meat Loaf
Meghan Trainor
Melissa Benoist
Melissa Manchester
Metro Boomin
Mew
MGMT
Michael Bolton
Michael Damian
Michael Jackson
Michael Learns To Rock
Michael Magee
Michael Kiessou
Michael Speaks
Michelle Williams
Midnight Oil
Miguel
Mike and the Mechanics
Mika Nakashima
Mikha Tambayong
Mikky Ekko
Miley Cyrus
Milton Nascimento
Miniature Tigers
Mira Awad
Miracle
Miranda Cosgrove
Misha B
Mobb Deep
Money Boy
Monica
Mónica Naranjo
The Monkees
Montaigne
Molly Sandén
Morteza Pashaei
Mother's Finest
Mountain
Myrtle Sarrosa
Mytha Lestari
Modern Talking

N

N Sync
Nas
Nat & Alex Wolff
Natalia Lafourcade
Natalie Bassingthwaite
Natalie Imbruglia
Natasha Bedingfield
Natassa Theodoridou
Nathalie Makoma
Nathaniel Willemse
National Philharmonic Orchestra
Nayer
Neha Kakkar
Nena
Neon Jungle
Netsky
Newton Faulkner
New Kids On The Block
Ne-yo
Niall Horan
Nicholas McDonald
Nick Carter
Nickelback
Nicki Minaj
Nicky Jam
Nicole Scherzinger
Nicolette Larson
Nindy Ayunda
Nikki Kerkhof
Nikki Clan
Nikki Ponte
Nil Karaibrahimgil
Nneka
No Good
Noemi
The Northern Pikes
The Notorious B.I.G.
The Nylons

O

Oasis
The Offspring
Ofra Haza
Oh Land
OJ
Ol' Dirty Bastard
Olly Murs
O'Shea
Our Lady Peace
Outlandish
OutKast
O-Zone
Ozzy Osbourne
Omarion
One Direction
Only Boys Aloud

P

P9
Pabllo Vittar
Padi
Paloma Faith
Passion Pit
Pato Fu
Paloma Mami
Paula DeAnda
Paula Tsui
Paul McCartney
Paul Potts
Paul Simon
Pearl Jam
Peking Duk
Penny Tai
Pet Shop Boys
Pentatonix
Pete Murray
Pete Rock
Peter Bjorn and John
Peter Frampton
Peter Gabriel
Pereza
Phenomena
Phil Collins
Phil Lam
Philadelphia Orchestra
Pink
Pink Floyd
Pitbull
Planet Hemp
Pnau
Preme
PrettyMuch
Prodigy
Project Pat
Prilly Latuconsina
Prince Royce

Q

Qwote
Q-Tip

R

R. Kelly
The Raccoons
Rachel Crow
Raekwon
Rainych
Randy Newman
Randy Travis
Rage Against the Machine
Raleigh Ritchie
Ram Jam
Real McCoy
Rebecca Ferguson
Red
Redbone
RedFaces
Rednex
Reigan Derry
Ricardo Arjona
Rick Astley
Rick Ross
Rick Springfield
Ricky Martin
Rihanna
Rhydian Roberts
Robbie Williams
Robert Goulet
Robert Tepper
Robertinho do Recife
Royal Philharmonic Orchestra
RPM
Rita Ora
Ruby Gloom
Ruel
RUFUS
RZA

S

Saara Aalto
Sadat X
Sade
Saiful
Samantha Fox
Samantha Jade
Santana
Sara Paxton
SB19
Scandal
Scatman John
Scorpions (band)
Scouting For Girls
The Script
Sean Kingston
SEARCH
Sepultura
Serebro
The Shakin' Pyramids
Shakira
SHE Band
Sheila on 7
Silent Sanctuary
Simon and Garfunkel
Skank
Skee-Lo
Spandau Ballet
Stereopony
Stonebwoy
Slim Whitman
Stan Walker
Steps
Steve Barakatt
Seven Network
Sergey Lazarev
The Strokes
Sıla
Spitalfield
Sasha Dobson
Shila Amzah
Skrillex
Slayer
Slot Machine (band)
Smash Mouth
Snoh Aalegra
Snoop Dogg
Son Dam Bi
Sonny Moore
Sonohra
Sons of Apollo
Soraya Arnelas
Stan Bush
Starship
Steve Perry
Steve Winwood
Steven Van Zandt
Stevie Wonder
Sueden
Sugababes
Suicidal Tendencies
Sum 41
Supercell
Superman Is Dead
Survivor
Susan Anton
Susan Boyle
Su Yunying
Svetlana Loboda
Sweet Sable
Switchfoot
System of a Down
Sorten Muld
SZA

T

T1419
T-Pain
T-Square
Taco
Tamera Foster
Tash
Tata Young
Taylor Henderson
Taylor Swift
Tasya Kamila
Tatjana Saphira
Tedua
Teen Angels
Tekno Miles
Tenacious D
Terryana Fatiah
Thalía
tha Supreme
The Backyardigans
The Black Eyed Peas
The Clash
The Presidents of the United States of America
The Remix Master
The Rose
The Sam Willows
The Script
Theo Tams
The Changcuters
The Eraserheads
The Stunners
The Gazette
The Ting Tings
The Urge
The Veronicas
The Vines
Three Days Grace
Three 6 Mafia
T. Mills
Tim Hwang
Tim Feehan
Tim McGraw
Tim Omaji
Timbo King
Tina Moore
Tina Turner
Tish
Tiwa Savage
Tommy Puett
Tommy Tutone
Toni Braxton
Tonight Alive
Tony Bennett
Tori Amos
Toto
Tove Styrke
Train
Trainwreck
Travis Scott
Trey Parker
A Tribe Called Quest
TripleS
Tupac Shakur
Tung Twista
Turma do Balão Mágico
Tyler, The Creator
Tyler Ward
Tyler Shaw

U

Usher
Union J
Udit Narayan

V

Vagetoz
Vampire Weekend
Vamps
Vangelis
Vania Larissa
Vanness Wu
Vazquez Sounds
Víctor Manuelle
Virginia Maestro
VL Mike
Velvet Revolver
Victoria Justice
Violetta Zironi

W

Wanessa
Walk Off the Earth
Walk the Moon
Wang Chung
Wang Leehom
"Weird Al" Yankovic
Westlife
Wham!
Whitney Houston
Will Smith
will.i.am
William Ackerman
William Warfield
Willow Smith
Wings
Within Temptation
Will Young
Wizkid
Wiz Khalifa
Wu-Tang Clan

X

The X-Ecutioners
XO-IX
Xuxa
Xzibit

Y

YARA (group)
Yashin
Yellow Magic Orchestra
Yiruma
Yovie & Nuno
Yui
Yuridia
Yo Gotti
Yuvan Shankar Raja
Young Pharoz
Yvette Michele

Z

Zoboomafoo
Zarema
Zendaya
Zara Larsson
Zayn
Zé Ramalho
Zezé Di Camargo & Luciano

See also
List of Sony BMG Music Entertainment artists for music artists engaged with Sony BMG

References

 Sony
Sony Music